Women in German history (Frauen der deutschen Geschichte) is a definitive stamp series issued in the Federal Republic of Germany (FRG) and West Berlin from 1986 to 1990, and in reunited Germany 1990 to 2003. The series was replaced by the current definitive series Blumen (flowers) from 3 January 2005.

Description
The stamps were designed by Gerd and Oliver Aretz.

Each stamp represents a portrait of a famous German woman. Two are Austrian: Lise Meitner and Bertha von Suttner. The color of the portrait is different from the color of the country name and denomination.

The name of the country on the stamps changed according to German history :
"Deutsche Bundespost" (Federal German Post), 1986–1990 in Western Germany and 1990–1995 in reunited Germany,
"Deutsche Bundespost – Berlin", 1986–1990 for a use in West Berlin,
"Deutschland" (Germany) since 1995.

The currency of the denomination changed too with the introduction of the euro:
1986 to 2000, expressed in pfennig and without a unit. For example: "100" for 100 pfennig (or 1 deutsche Mark).
in 2000 and 2001, the denomination is in pfennig and in euro (with use of € symbol).
since 2002, only euro is used with the € symbol.

Even if it was a definitive stamp series, because of the Reunification of Germany some issues for Westberlin were used only a short time and stamps with postmarks from real post services (not the collectors postmarks like most of Berlin 12) are rare.

List of the stamps

Women in German history (FRG and West Berlin)

Women in German history (after German reunification)

Women in German history (in euro)

References

Lists of people on postage stamps
Postage stamps of Germany
German women